At the 2000 Summer Olympics, three different gymnastics disciplines were contested: artistic gymnastics, rhythmic gymnastics, and trampoline.  The artistic gymnastics and trampoline events were held at the Sydney SuperDome on  16–25 September and  22–23 September, respectively.  The rhythmic gymnastics events were held at Pavilion 3 of the Sydney Olympic Park on 28 September – 1 October.

Artistic gymnastics

Format of competition
No compulsory routines were performed in artistic gymnastics at the 2000 Summer Olympics.  Instead, all participating gymnasts, including those who were not part of a team, participated in a qualification round.  The results of this competition determined which teams and individuals participated in the remaining competitions, which included:

The team competition, in which the six highest scoring teams from qualifications competed.  Each team of six gymnasts could have up to five gymnasts perform on each apparatus, and only the four highest scores counted toward the team total.
The all-around competition, in which the thirty-six highest scoring individuals in the all-around competed.  Each country was limited to three gymnasts in the all-around final.
The event finals, in which the eight highest scoring individuals on each apparatus competed.  Each country was limited to two gymnasts in each apparatus final.

Men's events

Women's events
Andreea Răducan originally won the gold medal in the women's all-around competition, but she was disqualified after she tested positive for pseudoephedrine.

The Federation Internationale de Gymnastique Executive Board announced on 27 February 2010 after an investigation into the Chinese team for violations of age rules for senior gymnastics competitions that team member Dong Fangxiao, who had been entered as 17 years old, was actually 14 at the time of the Olympics (two years below the minimum age). Her 1999 World Championships and 2000 Olympic results were struck from the records, and in April 2010, nearly ten years after the event, the IOC officially disqualified China, who had originally won the bronze medal in the women's team event.

The now-third place team from the United States was awarded the bronze at the 2010 national championships, held at the XL Center in Hartford, CT.

Rhythmic gymnastics

Trampoline

Medal table

See also
Gymnastics at the 1998 Asian Games
Gymnastics at the 1998 Commonwealth Games
Gymnastics at the 1999 Pan American Games
1999 World Artistic Gymnastics Championships

References

External links
 Official Olympic Report
 gymnasticsresults.com
 gymn-forum.net
 
 
 

 
2000 Summer Olympics events
2000
Olympics
International gymnastics competitions hosted by Australia